Akanes is a Greek sweet similar to loukoumi, only that it is flavoured with fresh goatsmilk butter rather than fruit essences. It is made exclusively in the town of Serres in Northern Greece. The name akanes dates back to the time of Ottoman rule in Greece, when it was called hakanes halva or royal halva (hakan deriving from the Turkish han and kağan). The sweet is available especially in the regional unit of Serres and in delicacy shops throughout Greece.

References

External links
 Website describing "Akanes Lailia" of Serres

Greek cuisine
Confectionery